Kokum oil is a seed oil derived from the seeds of the kokum tree (Garcinia indica; also known as wild mangosteen or red mangosteen).  Kokum oil is edible and can also be used for things other than cooking.

Kokum fruits contain five to eight large seeds which account for 20-23% of the fruit's weight. The kernels account for 61 percent of the weight of the seed, while the oil content of the kernel accounts for about 44%. The seeds are compressed and embedded in an acidic pulp. The oil content of the seeds is 23-26%. The average yield of seeds for a tree is 10-15 kilograms. The fruits are collected for seeds from April to May. The kernels account for 60% of the fruit by weight. The oil content of a kernel is 41-42%. A kernel contains protein up to 17%.

Collection of seeds
Fruits are collected manually by handpicking. The tree branches are shaken with long sticks and fallen fruits are collected. The fruits are broken by sticks to separate the seeds, which are picked up by hand. Then the separated seeds are dried to reduce their moisture content.

Properties of oil
Kokum oil or kokum butter is light gray or yellowish in color.  After refining, the kokum fat is equivalent to vanaspati ghee.

Kokum oil contains up to 60-65% saturated fatty acid, making it solid at room temperature, so this oil is known as kokum butter or kokum fat. Its triglyceride composition is uniform and consists of up to 80% of stearic-oleic-stearic (SOS) triglycerides. Because its slip melting point is close to human body temperature (37°C), it tends to melt on skin contact.

Fatty acid composition of fat

Uses 
Kokum butter is non-greasy and gets absorbed into the skin once it is applied. It is often used as a substitute for cocoa butter due to its triglyceride composition.  Kokum butter has emollient properties and good oxidative stability, which can assist emulsion integrity. With its relatively higher melt point, it melts slightly at skin temperatures, making it ideal for lipsticks and balms. It is also added in the making of bar soaps and skin lotions.

References

Vegetable oils
Flora of India (region)
Horticulture in India